is a 1988 Japanese anime television series featuring the Italian character Topo Gigio. The series ran for 34 episodes in Japan in 1988, and in Italy in 1992.

In other languages

References

External links
 

1988 anime television series debuts
Nippon Animation
Animated television series about mice and rats
Animated television series about cats